Enteles  is a genus of weevil in the family Curculionidae. 

The genus was first described by Carl Johan Schönherr in 1837. The type species is Enteles vigorsii. The genus name derives from the Greek, εντελησ, which means "complete", "perfect".

Species
Enteles bicolor<ref name=bicolor>{{cite web|url=https://animaldiversity.org/accounts/Enteles_bicolor/classification/#Enteles_bicolor|title=ADW: Enteles bicolor|accessdate=2021-08-11}}</ref> (Dimorphothynnus bicolor is now the accepted name)Enteles ocellatus (accepted as Perissops ocellatus)
 Enteles vicinus Enteles vigorsii''

References

Curculionidae genera
Taxa named by Carl Johan Schönherr